Gmina Osieczna may refer to either of the following administrative districts in Poland:
Gmina Osieczna, Greater Poland Voivodeship
Gmina Osieczna, Pomeranian Voivodeship